"Save Tonight" is a song by Swedish rock musician Eagle-Eye Cherry, released on 7 October 1997 as the lead single from his debut album, Desireless (1997). It is the album's opening track and gained substantial radio success, reaching number three in Ireland, number five in the United States, number six in the United Kingdom, and number two in Cherry's native Sweden. It was voted song of the year by New Zealand radio station The Edge. "Save Tonight" is considered the signature song of Cherry, and was awarded the Rockbjörnen award in the "Swedish song of the year 1997" category.

Critical reception
Larry Flick of Billboard wrote, "With a voice mildly reminiscent of Seal, the lad gives "Save Tonight" a richly soulful edge that cuts through the track's shiny arrangement of strumming acoustic guitars and prickly electric licks. Beyond the single's well-crafted surface are vivid, storyteller lyrics that are smarter than what you'll typically find on radio. An excellent, commercially sound way of introducing the artist's sterling full-length debut, Desireless, this cut demands immediate modern and mainstream rock radio play—and perhaps even triple-A and eventually top 40 stations." Scottish newspaper Daily Record felt that with the song, "late jazz legend Don's son and Neneh's brother is living up to his musical heritage."

Music video
The monochrome music video for the song was filmed at Skånegatan 92-94 in Stockholm's Södermalm district from 9–10 September 1997, and features Eagle-Eye Cherry playing different characters and seeing the story from different perspectives. The first is a man readying for a date by buying roses and a bottle of wine at a deli. He then tells the butcher "goodbye" and the camera reveals that the butcher is in fact Cherry himself. A robber wearing tights on his head as a means of disguise (bought in the very first scene of the music video, which is watched by Cherry via shop window) then comes and takes the money out of the cash register. As he leaves, he is hit by a pickup truck, and as bystanders help him up he is revealed to actually be Cherry, as well as the driver in the truck. Another Cherry is seen playing a guitar and another is a bum on the street. The "first" Cherry appears once again at the end of the video, walking to the home of his date. The video gives the illusion of being presented as one continuous take.

Track listings

 Swedish and European CD single, UK cassette single
 "Save Tonight" – 3:55
 "Conversation" – 4:55

 UK CD single
 "Save Tonight"
 "Save Tonight" (Bacon & Quarmby remix)
 "Conversation"
 "Save Tonight" (video)

 Australasian CD single
 "Save Tonight"
 "Save Tonight" (Bacon & Quarmby remix)
 "Conversation"

Personnel
Personnel are lifted from the Desireless album booklet.
 Eagle-Eye Cherry – music, lyrics, vocals, background vocals, co-production
 Mattias Torell – acoustic guitar, electric guitar
 Klas Åhlund – electric guitar
 Elias Modig – bass
 Magnus Persson – drums
 Adam Kviman – production, mixing, engineering

Charts and certifications

Weekly charts

Year-end charts

Certifications

Release history

E.M.D. version

In 2010, Swedish boy band E.M.D. released a cover version of "Save Tonight" as the first single from their second studio album, Rewind (2010). Released first through digital stores on 28 May, the single had a physical release on 16 June.

Track listing
 CD and digital single
 "Save Tonight" – 3:35

Charts

References

External links
 Eagle-Eye Cherry's official website
  – music video

1997 songs
1997 debut singles
Black-and-white music videos
Eagle-Eye Cherry songs
English-language Swedish songs
Polydor Records singles